Qufu Road is an interchange station on Line 8 and Line 12 of the Shanghai Metro. The station began operation on 29 December 2007, and it is located in Shanghai's Jing'an District. The Line 12 station was opened on 10 May 2014, and served as the western terminus of the line until the opening of the extension to Qixin Road on 19 December 2015.

Station Layout

References

Railway stations in Shanghai
Shanghai Metro stations in Jing'an District
Line 8, Shanghai Metro
Line 12, Shanghai Metro
Railway stations in China opened in 2007